GET4 is a protein that in humans is encoded by the GET4 gene.

References

External links

Further reading